The Cheetah Girls Soundcheck is the second EP by the Cheetah Girls available only at Wal-Mart as a digital download-exclusive release as a part of the Soundcheck series. The video performances of the tracks were released on July 16, 2008. The EP includes one song from The Cheetah Girls 2, one song from their studio album TCG and three songs from The Cheetah Girls: One World. The EP was released on August 19, 2008, the same day as the One World soundtrack. This is the Cheetah Girls' second album to feature live vocals, the first being In Concert: The Party's Just Begun Tour.

Track listing

References

2008 EPs
The Cheetah Girls albums
Walt Disney Records EPs